Leonardo Ventura Jesus Chão (born 1 August 1999) is a Portuguese professional footballer of Macanese descent, who plays as a forward for the club Vitória Setúbal in the Primeira Liga.

Professional career
Chão made his professional debut with Vitória Setúbal in a 3-1 Primeira Liga loss to Sporting CP on 11 January 2020.

References

External links
 
 
 Leonardo Chão at playmakerstats.com (English version of zerozero.pt)

1999 births
Living people
Sportspeople from Setúbal
Portuguese footballers
Portugal youth international footballers
Portuguese people of Chinese descent
Vitória F.C. players
Primeira Liga players
Association football forwards